The 1944 United States presidential election in Montana took place on November 7, 1944 as part of the 1944 United States presidential election. Voters chose four representatives, or electors to the Electoral College, who voted for president and vice president.

Montana voted to give Democratic nominee, President Franklin D. Roosevelt a record fourth term, over the Republican nominee, New York Governor Thomas E. Dewey. Roosevelt won Montana by the substantial margin of 9.35%. This was the last occasion Gallatin County voted for a Democratic presidential candidate until Barack Obama carried the county in 2008.

Roosevelt remains the last Democratic presidential candidate to have carried Montana twice.

Results

Results by county

See also
 United States presidential elections in Montana

References

Montana
1944
1944 Montana elections